The Drama Desk Special Award is an annual award presented by Drama Desk in recognition of achievements by an individual or an organization that has made a significant contribution to the theatre among Broadway, Off Broadway and Off-Off Broadway productions.

Winners and nominees

1970s

1980s

1990s

2000s

2010s

2020s

See also
 Society of London Theatre Special Award
 Special Tony Award

References

External links
 Drama Desk official website

Special